Year 106 (CVI) was a common year starting on Thursday (link will display the full calendar) of the Julian calendar. At the time, it was known as the Year of the Consulship of Commodus and Civica (or, less frequently, year 859 Ab urbe condita). The denomination 106 for this year has been used since the early medieval period, when the Anno Domini calendar era became the prevalent method in Europe for naming years.

Events 
 By place 

 Roman Empire 

 Ignatius writes a letter to Christians in Smyrna, using the term Catholic Church (approximate date). This is the earliest surviving witness to the use of the term "Catholic Church".
 Emperor Trajan conquers the Dacian Fortresses of the Orăştie Mountains, and surrounds the capital, Sarmizegetusa. 
 Battle of Sarmizegetusa: The Dacians are defeated, and the city is encircled with a circumvallation line. When the Romans destroy the water pipes, King Decebalus flees, and commits suicide.
 August 11 – The south-eastern part of Dacia (modern Romania) becomes a Roman province: Roman Dacia. The veterans of the legions are given land in the new province for their service in the Roman army.
 Trajan annexes the Nabataean Kingdom (with its capital Petra) as the Roman province of Arabia Petraea. The epoch of the calendar of the province of Arabia begins on March 22.

 China 
 February 13 – Emperor He of Han dies after a 18-year reign. Empress Dowager Deng places her infant son Han Shangdi on the Chinese throne. First and the only year of yanping era.
 September 21 – Han Shangdi dies after a 7-month reign and is succeeded by his 12-year-old cousin Han Andi as ruler of the Chinese Eastern Han Dynasty (until 125).

 By topic 

 Literature 
 Aelianus Tacticus (or Aelian) writes his Taktike Theoria (approximate date).

Deaths 
 February 13 – He of Han, Chinese emperor of the Han Dynasty (b. AD 79)
 September 21 – Han Shangdi, Chinese emperor of the Han Dynasty (b. 105)
 Decebalus, king of Dacia (suicide, being pursued by the Romans) (b. AD 87)
 Liu Qing, Chinese prince of the Han Dynasty (b. AD 78)
 Rabbel II Soter, ruler of the Nabataean Kingdom

References